Teressa (Teressa language: Luroo, also called Tarasa Dwip) is one of the Nicobar Islands, India.

History
When Austria claimed Nicobar Islands as a colony (1778-1784) on the assumption that Denmark had abandoned its claim (1754/56-1868), they named Teressa after the Austrian Arch-duchess Maria Theresia.
Extensive damage to the island's flora and fauna occurred following the 2004 Indian Ocean earthquake and tsunami.

Geography
Teressa lies west of the neighboring island of Camorta and northwest of Katchal. The smaller island known as Chowra is to the north and Bompoka lies to the east. The northern portion of the island has elevations reaching 87 meters. 
The island has a surface area of 101.26 km2.

Demography
The Indian National Census of 2011 showed the island to have a population of 1,934, and the largest settlements were: Bengali (354), Kalasi (335), and Minyuk (305).

Administration
The island belongs to the township of Nancowry of Teressa Taluk.

Image gallery
Safed Balu Beach

The Safed Balu Beach (white sand beach) is situated at the east opposite to Bampoka Island.

References 

Teressa Taluk
Islands of the Andaman and Nicobar Islands
Nicobar district
Nicobar Islands
Populated places in India
Islands of India
Islands of the Bay of Bengal